Tendra Spit is a sandbar in the Black Sea and part of Kherson Oblast in Ukraine.

The island serves as a separation of the Gulf of Tendra from the Black Sea and is located at the southern and western part of the bay. In the west the island has a spit Bili Kuchuhury which, stretching east through the Gulf of Tendra as a shoal, reaches the Yahorlyk Kut peninsula. Bili Kuchuhury has the Bili Kuchuhury Lighthouse.

Tendra Lighthouse is also on the island.

See also
 Dzharylhach

External links
 Tendra Spit at the Encyclopedia of Ukraine
 Photos of Tendra Spit at May 2016

Geography of Kherson Oblast
Islands of Ukraine
Islands of the Black Sea
Spits of the Black Sea
Spits of Ukraine